Dassu is a tehsil located in Upper Kohistan District, Khyber Pakhtunkhwa, Pakistan. The population is 222,282 according to the 2017 census.

See also 
 List of tehsils of Khyber Pakhtunkhwa

References 

Tehsils of Khyber Pakhtunkhwa